WOW is the debut solo studio album by American singer Wendy O. Williams, released in 1984 by Passport Records. It is her first album appearance after the success with The Plasmatics, which had gone on a hiatus during that time. Williams was nominated for Grammy Award for Best Female Rock Vocal Performance for this album in 1985.

Background
After the release of the album Coup d'État in 1982, The Plasmatics opened for KISS on their Creatures of the Night tour. By the end of the tour, The Plasmatics' recording contract with Capitol Records wasn't renewed and Kiss bassist Gene Simmons approached Williams and Rod Swenson about producing an album. As to avoid legal issues with Capitol, they decided not to use The Plasmatics' name on the record in any way.

Recording
Simmons recorded the performance of band members from The Plasmatics on the album namely, Wes Beech and T.C. Tolliver on rhythm and lead guitar, and drums respectively. He also used many additional musicians, in order to not be constrained by a fixed sound or performer. Simmons himself played bass under the pseudonym-stage name of Reginald Van Helsing. Michael Ray was hired as lead guitarist for the album. Simmons also pulled in the guest-appearance talents of Kiss members Ace Frehley to play on "Bump and Grind", Vinnie Vincent to co-write "Ain't None of Your Business", Paul Stanley to play on "Ready to Rock", and Eric Carr to play on "Legends Never Die". WOW is a hard rock album influenced by heavy metal, which marked a musical departure from Williams' previous material with The Plasmatics.

"It's My Life" was released as the lead single from the album. It later appeared on the soundtrack to the film Reform School Girls (1986), in which Williams starred. Kiss later released their version of the song, as well as "Thief in the Night".

Reception

WOW received mixed reviews. Ralph Heibutzki or AllMusic wrote, "In some ways, Williams' first solo venture amounts to a watered-down echo of the Plasmatics' own bid for mainstream success, Coup d'Etat (1982), minus the latter record's radical political bent. That's not surprising, with the ever-career-conscious Simmons manning the producer's chair. Despite his best efforts, however, Williams would stay a quintessential cult artist. While not a remarkable record, WOW offers a convincing enough glimpse of the stardom that should have been hers all along."

Track listing
All credits adapted from the original release.

Personnel
Band members
Wendy O. Williams – vocals
Wes Beech – rhythm guitar, lead guitar on "It's My Life"
Michael Ray – lead guitar
'Reginald Van Helsing' (Gene Simmons) – bass
T.C. Tolliver – drums
The Boys – backing vocals

Additional musicians
Ace Frehley – lead guitar on "Bump and Grind"
Paul Stanley – guitar on "Ready to Rock"
Eric Carr – drums on "Legends Never Die"
Mitch Weissman – piano on "Opus in Cm7"
Micki Free – acoustic guitar on "Legends Never Die"

Production
Frank Filipetti, Tom Roberts – engineers
Billy Miranda, Tom Brick, Moira Marquis – assistant engineers
George Marino – mastering
Gene Simmons – producer

References

External links

[ WOW] at AllMusic

Wendy O. Williams albums
1984 debut albums
Albums produced by Gene Simmons
Passport Records albums